Robert Nichol (12 February 1890 – 16 April 1925) was a Scottish Labour Party politician.  He was educated at Shawlands Academy, Glasgow.

He was first elected at the 1922 general election as the Member of Parliament (MP) for Renfrewshire East. He was re-elected in 1923, and held the seat until his defeat at the 1924 general election by the Unionist candidate, Alexander Munro MacRobert. It would be another 74 years before the constituents would elect a Labour MP again, when future Leader of the Scottish Labour Party, Jim Murphy was elected in 1997.

References

External links 
 

1890 births
1925 deaths
Members of the Parliament of the United Kingdom for Scottish constituencies
UK MPs 1922–1923
UK MPs 1923–1924
Scottish Labour MPs